Peniamina Percival (born 8 November 1994) is a judoka from Samoa. He competed at the 2020 Summer Olympics, in the Judo – Men's 81 kg. His coach at the olympics was his brother Iosefa Percival. He trains at a local Dojo in Osaka.

Early and personal life
Percival is from Tiapapata in Apia and was born to a Samoan father and American mother. He attended Brandeis University in Waltham, Massachusetts where he studied environmental studies and international studies. Prior to that he had begun judo aged 13. In 2016 he had a semester in Japan and obtained his first judo black belt. He sells traditional handmade bonecarvings, and also is a music producer and DJ for the Original Samoan Krump Kingz, by the name of 685 Metal.

He won a bronze medal at the 2019 Pacific Games in Apia.

References

External links
 

Living people
1994 births
Sportspeople from Apia
Samoan male judoka
Olympic judoka of Samoa
Judoka at the 2020 Summer Olympics
Brandeis University alumni